Javier García may refer to:

Javier García (handballer) (born 1947), Spanish handballer
Javier García (pole vaulter) (born 1966), Spanish pole vaulter
Javier García (fencer) (born 1976), Spanish fencer
Javier García (rower) (born 1992), Spanish rower
Javi García (born 1987), Spanish footballer
Javi García (footballer, born 1977), Spanish footballer
Javier Portillo (Spanish footballer) (born 1982), full name Javier García Portillo, Spanish footballer
Javier García Duchini (born 1963), Uruguayan physician and politician
Luis Javier García Sanz, known as Luis García, Spanish footballer
Javier Guerrero García (born 1958), Mexican politician
Javier Hernán García (born 1987), Argentine footballer
Javier Hernández García (born 1983), Spanish footballer
Javier Jiménez García (born 1997), Spanish footballer
Javier Orihuela García (born 1955), Mexican politician
Javier Garcia (soccer), American soccer player
 Javier Garcia, the main protagonist of The Walking Dead: A New Frontier

See also
Xavier García (disambiguation)